Regen is a town in Bavaria, Germany.

Regen may also refer to

 Regen (district), around the town of Regen
 Regen (river), in Germany
 Ivan Regen (1868–1947), biologist
 Radio Regen, a radio charity in Manchester, England
 Regen SW, renewable energy agency in south-west England
 Rain (1929 film), a Dutch short film
 Regenerative braking, regen for short

See also

 Ruegen (disambiguation)